Arinze Obiora (born 5 December 1985) is a retired Nigerian high jumper.

He finished fourth at the 2003 All-Africa Games, sixth at the 2006 African Championships, won the bronze medal at the 2007 All-Africa Games and finished sixth at the 2008 African Championships.

His personal best was 2.20 metres, achieved in July 2007 in Algiers.

References

1985 births
Living people
Nigerian male high jumpers
Place of birth missing (living people)
African Games bronze medalists for Nigeria
African Games medalists in athletics (track and field)
Athletes (track and field) at the 2007 All-Africa Games
21st-century Nigerian people